Bas van Velthoven (born 26 February 1985 in Hazerswoude-Rijndijk) is a Dutch swimmer who specializes in freestyle. He is currently training in Amsterdam with Nick Driebergen, Femke Heemskerk and Chantal Groot with the coach Martin Truijens. He held the European record in the 4 × 100 m freestyle short course with Robert Lijesen, Mitja Zastrow and Robin van Aggele in 3:09.18. This record was set during the World SC Championships 2008 in Manchester where the Dutch team finished second behind the United States, who broke the world record in the same race. A few weeks before, at the 2008 European Aquatics Championships in Eindhoven, he won the bronze medal in the 4 × 100 m freestyle.

See also
 List of swimmers
 List of Dutch records in swimming

References

1985 births
Living people
Dutch male freestyle swimmers
Olympic swimmers of the Netherlands
Swimmers at the 2008 Summer Olympics
People from Hazerswoude
Medalists at the FINA World Swimming Championships (25 m)
European Aquatics Championships medalists in swimming
Sportspeople from South Holland
21st-century Dutch people